Harold P. Pierce (August 11, 1917 – March 8, 1988) was an African-American entrepreneur who founded the successful Harold's Chicken Shack restaurant chain in Chicago, Illinois.

Pierce was born in Midway, Alabama and moved to Chicago in 1943 from Freemanville, Alabama to work as a chauffeur for Jack Stern, a furniture store owner. By 1950, he was running a small restaurant with his wife, Hilda, on 39th Street.  The H & H specialized in chicken feet and dumplings.  Pierce thought that he could adapt his recipe for fried chicken, and a friend, Gene Rosen, who ran a poultry shop nearby, offered him some chickens to experiment with.  The resultant recipe caused Pierce to open Harold's Chicken Shack at 47th and Greenwood in 1950.

He franchised the idea out to friends and family who opened additional Harold Chicken Shacks throughout Chicago.  One of Pierce's stipulations was that they purchase their chickens from Rosen.  Otherwise, Pierce didn't interfere with the management of the stores, which led to deviations in the techniques, flavors, and qualities of the product as well as variations in the menu from one restaurant to another. After retiring in the early 1980s, he moved to Beaverville, Illinois, where he indulged in a passion for raising hunting dogs. Pierce died in Kankakee, Illinois of prostate cancer in 1988.  His second wife, Willa, took over running the business and began expanding it outside of Chicago. Willa died on January 21, 2003, in Beaverville.

References
 "Harold Pierce, 70, Dies, Chicken Franchise Founder," Jet, March 28, 1988
 "Harold Pierce, 70, founder of Harold's Chicken Shacks," Chicago Sun-Times, March 11, 1988.
 Social Security Death Index

External links
 Sula, Mike. "The First Family of Fried Chicken", Chicago Reader, April 14, 2006.

1917 births
1988 deaths
Fast-food chain founders
People from Midway, Alabama
Deaths from prostate cancer
Deaths from cancer in Illinois
Businesspeople from Chicago
American restaurateurs
African-American businesspeople
20th-century American businesspeople
20th-century African-American people